The Liangtoutang Formation, also referred to as the Laijia Formation is a geological formation located in Zhejiang, China. Its strata date back to the Albian to Cenomanian stages of the Cretaceous period. The lithology primarily consists of red sandstone.

Fossil content

Dinosaurs

Other fossils 
Fossil eggs
 Macroelongatoolithus xixiaensis
 Pachycorioolithus jinyunensis
 Testudoolithus jiangi

References

Bibliography 
  
 
  
 

Geologic formations of China
Lower Cretaceous Series of Asia
Cretaceous China
Albian Stage
Cenomanian Stage
Sandstone formations
Lacustrine deposits
Ooliferous formations
Paleontology in Zhejiang